Josephus Atkinson Farm, also known as the Charles D. Wellington Farm, is a historic home and farm located in Clinton Township, Cass County, Indiana. The house was built about 1865, and is a two-story, three bay Italianate style brick dwelling.  It has a hipped roof and -story gabled ell. Also on the property are the contributing drive-through corn crib (c. 1910), two large barns (c. 1910), garage (c. 1920), and storage shed (c. 1920).

It was listed on the National Register of Historic Places in 2010.

References

Farms on the National Register of Historic Places in Indiana
Italianate architecture in Indiana
Houses completed in 1865
Houses in Cass County, Indiana
National Register of Historic Places in Cass County, Indiana